Sanfront is a comune (municipality) in the Province of Cuneo in the Italian region Piedmont, located about  southwest of Turin and about  northwest of Cuneo.  

Sanfront borders the following municipalities: Barge, Brossasco, Envie, Gambasca, Paesana, Rifreddo, and Sampeyre.

References

Cities and towns in Piedmont